Lorna Doone is a 1912 British silent historical film directed by Wilfred Noy and starring Dorothy Bellew. The film is an adaptation of the 1869 novel Lorna Doone by R. D. Blackmore, set in Seventeenth century Devon.

Cast
 Dorothy Bellew as Lorna Doone

References

Bibliography
 Klossner, Michael. The Europe of 1500-1815 on Film and Television: A Worldwide Filmography of Over 2550 Works, 1895 Through 2000. McFarland & Company, 2002.

External links
 

1912 films
1910s historical drama films
British historical drama films
British silent feature films
1910s English-language films
Films directed by Wilfred Noy
Films based on Lorna Doone
British black-and-white films
1912 drama films
1910s British films
Silent historical drama films